Kingston Polytechnic College, established in 2004,  is a polytechnic, spread across 27.5 acres of land in Barasat, North 24 Parganas district, West Bengal.

About college
This polytechnic is affiliated with the West Bengal State Council of Technical Education,  and recognized by AICTE, New Delhi. This polytechnic offers diploma courses in  Electronics and Telecommunication, Automobile, Electrical, Computer Science & Technology, Mechanical and Civil Engineering. The college has a separate 3 months professional course on Solar Engineering.

See also

References

External links
 Admission to Polytechnics in West Bengal for Academic Session 2006-2007
 Kingston Polytechnic College
Official website WBSCTE

Universities and colleges in North 24 Parganas district
Educational institutions established in 2004
2004 establishments in West Bengal
Technical universities and colleges in West Bengal